This is a list of notable alumni and distinguished faculty at Middle Tennessee State University.

Athletics
Dewon Brazelton – Major League Baseball pitcher
Tony Burse (1986) – former National Football League running back
Kevin Byard (2015) – 2017 All Pro Safety National Football League defensive back
Mike Caldwell (1993) – former National Football League linebacker
Tyrone Calico (2002) – former National Football League wide receiver
Marty Carter (1991) – former National Football League safety
Alysha Clark (2010) – Women's National Basketball Association forward
Jerry DeLucca (1956) – former National Football League offensive tackle
Don Griffin (1986) – former National Football League safety
James Griffin (1983) – former National Football League safety
Dwone Hicks (2003) – former National Football League running back
Andrico Hines (2003) – Arena Football League player
Kelly Holcomb (1995) – former National Football League quarterback
Amber Holt (2008) – Women's National Basketball Association forward
Richie James (2017) - National Football League wide receiver
Shawn Jones (2014) - basketball player for Hapoel Haifa of the Israeli Basketball Premier League
Jeremy Kellem (2010) – Arena Football League defensive back
ReShard Lee (2003) – National Football League running back
David Little (1984) – former National Football League tight end
Mike Moore (1978) – Houston Oilers Chattanooga Sports Hall of Fame
Kendall Newson (2001) – former National Football League wide receiver
Ray Oldham (1973) – former National Football League safety
Jayhawk Owens – former Major League Baseball catcher
Shane Primm – UFC contestant on The Ultimate Fighter Season 8 Light-Heavyweight Fighter
Jonathan Quinn (1998) – former National Football League quarterback
Mardy Scales (2003) – United States sprinter
Dwight Stone (1986) – former National Football League wide receiver
Phillip Tanner (2010) – former National Football League running back
Joe Campbell, running back, National Football League, LA Rams 
Kenny Tippins (1989) – former National Football League linebacker
Ken Trickey (1955) – college basketball coach
 Reggie Upshaw (2017) - basketball player in the Israel Basketball Premier League
Erik Walden (2008) – National Football League linebacker
Josh Walker – National Football League guard

Musicians
Julien Baker – singer, songwriter, and guitarist
Brooke Barrettsmith – Billboard charting singer, songwriter, guitarist, and pianist
Scott "Skippy" Chapman (2001) – keyboardist and singer-songwriter, Code of Ethics
George S. Clinton (1969) – Hollywood composer (Austin Powers trilogy)
Cedric Dent (Gospel Music Singer) – member of Take 6. Professor of Theory & Composition in the MTSU School of Music.
Colton Dixon (2010) – American Idol Season 11 Contestant – Top 7
Brett Eldredge - singer-songwriter, guitarist
Bobby Bosko Grubic (a.k.a. Bobby G) (1999) – singer-songwriter, director/producer
Chris James – singer-songwriter, producer and Grammy Award-nominated engineer for Prince
Amy Lee (2000/dropped out) – co-founder and lead singer, Evanescence
Brice Long (1993) – country music singer-songwriter
Sean McConnell – American singer-songwriter
The Protomen (Rock Band) – Independent concept band based in Nashville
Jeremi Richardson (singer) – member of the CCM group Avalon
Laura Rogers – of the Americana music duo The Secret Sisters
Hillary Scott (2006) – singer-songwriter, Lady A
Natalie Prass – American singer-songwriter
Sharon Van Etten – American singer-songwriter
Chris Young – country music singer; 2006 winner, Nashville Star
Count Bass D – rapper, producer
Isaiah Rashad – rapper
Torrance "Street Symphony" Esmond – producer; 57th Annual Grammy Award for Best Contemporary Christian Music Performance/Song
Tay Keith – producer
Lecrae - rapper
 Michael Wilson Hardy - American Country Music singer-songwriter

Nobel Prize Laureates
James M. Buchanan, B.A. (1940) – 1986 Nobel Prize in Economics Laureate
Muhammad Yunus – 2006 Nobel Peace Prize Laureate, professor of economics (1969–1972)

Politicians
Bill Boner (1967) – Mayor of Nashville, Tennessee (1987–1991) and U.S. Representative (Democrat – 5th District Tennessee – 1979–1987)
Bart Gordon (1971) – U.S. Representative (Democrat – 6th District Tennessee – 1985–2011)
Albert Gore, Sr. (1932) – U.S. Senator (Democrat – Tennessee – 1953–1971)
Andy Ogles (2007) – Mayor of Maury County, Tennessee (2018–2022) and U.S. Representative (Republican – 5th District Tennessee – 2023–present)
Robert Rochelle (1968) – Tennessee State Senator from 1970 to 2002.

Others
Bryan M. Clayton - businessman and real estate investor,  CEO and cofounder of GreenPal.
Jon Coffelt (1981–1984) – New York City artist, painter, sculptor
Erika Costell – YouTuber, model, and singer
Brandon Curry – IFBB professional bodybuilder
 Donna Scott Davenport – embattled Rutherford County, Tennessee juvenile court Judge 
Lane Davies (Actor) – known for portraying Mason Capwell in Santa Barbara
Ashley Eicher – Miss Tennessee 2004
Mark Gwyn – director, Tennessee Bureau of Investigation (2004–2018)
Nick Levay (b. 1977) – Chief Security Officer at organizations such as the Council on Foreign Relations
Sondra Locke (1944–2018) – Oscar-nominated actress and director
Bayer Mack – award-nominated writer, record executive and film producer.
Mary Scales – first black MTSU faculty member and first black female Murfreesboro City Councilperson.
Wayne White – artist, known for his work on Pee-wee's Playhouse

References

External links
MTSU Alumni Association